Henricus "Rik" Stephanus Clerckx (31 August 1936 – 19 December 1985) was a Belgian long-distance runner. He competed in the men's 5000 metres and men's 10000 metres at the 1964 Summer Olympics.

References

1936 births
1985 deaths
Athletes (track and field) at the 1964 Summer Olympics
Belgian male long-distance runners
Olympic athletes of Belgium
Place of birth missing